Milad Badragheh (born 17 August 1996) is an Iranian footballer who plays as a midfielder who currently plays for Iranian club Foolad in the Persian Gulf Pro League.

Honours

Club
Foolad
Hazfi Cup: 2020–21

Iranian Super Cup: 2021

References

1996 births
Living people
Iranian footballers
Foolad FC players
Association football midfielders